Take a Letter, Mr. Jones is a British sitcom starring John Inman and Rula Lenska that aired for a single series of six episodes produced by Southern Television for the ITV network from 5 September to 10 October 1981. It was created by Ronald Chesney and Ronald Wolfe.

Plot
Graham Jones (John Inman) works as a personal secretary to female executive Joan Warner (Rula Lenska), within a London-based multinational corporation called 8-Star. Although he ably assists her in their busy office, Graham often helps Joan with her equally hectic domestic arrangements as she is a single mother to seven-year-old daughter, Lucy. Miriam Margolyes plays Joan's excitable Italian housekeeper, Maria.

Context and afterlife
John Inman starred in Take a Letter, Mr. Jones between seasons of the BBC sitcom Are You Being Served? Take a Letter, Mr. Jones was never a ratings success (only running for six episodes), but in recent years it has been resurrected by many American PBS stations, where Are You Being Served? is also a hit. A UK repeat of the series was shown on Film24 in 2010.

A US VHS set of the series was released by Questar in 1995. A UK DVD of the series was released in 2009 by Simply Home Entertainment. UK channel Talking Pictures TV reshowed the series in 2015 and 2018.

Episode list

{| class="wikitable plainrowheaders" style="width:70%; background:#FFFFFF;"
|-
!style="background:#cccccc;"|#
!style="background:#cccccc;"|Title
!style="background:#cccccc;"|Director
!style="background:#cccccc;"|Writers
!style="background:#cccccc;"|Original air date

|}

References

External links

1981 British television series debuts
1981 British television series endings
1980s British sitcoms
1980s British workplace comedy television series
ITV sitcoms
Television shows produced by Southern Television
English-language television shows
Television shows set in the United Kingdom
British workplace comedy television series